Julanne Johnston (May 1, 1900 – December 26, 1988) was an American silent film actress.

Biography
Johnston was born and educated in Indianapolis, Indiana, then her family moved to Hollywood. There she took dancing lessons at the Denishawn School and acted with the Hollywood Community Theatre for two years. She also attended the Hollywood School for Girls.

Johnston began her career as a solo dancer and toured with Ruth St. Denis during summer vacations from school. In 1924, she was selected to be a WAMPAS Baby Star.

Douglas Fairbanks saw Johnston dance in a theater before the premiere of his film Robin Hood, and this exposure resulted in his signing her to be the leading lady in The Thief of Bagdad, with Anna May Wong in 1924. The same year, she was on William Randolph Hearst's yacht the Oneida during the weekend in November 1924 when film director and producer Thomas Ince later died of apparent heart failure (many conspiracy theories exist about Ince's death).

Johnston retired from acting in 1934.

Johnston married David W. Rust, and they lived in Detroit, Michigan. They had two children, Peggy Rust Johnson and David Wendell Rust. Johnston lost her 62-year-old husband and her 29-year-old son within the space of six years.

She died in Grosse Pointe, Michigan, at the age of 88. Her remains were buried at Woodlawn Cemetery in Detroit.

Partial filmography

 Youth (1917, uncredited)
 Better Times (1919)
 Miss Hobbs (1920) - Millicent Farey
 Fickle Women (1920) - Janie Cullison
 Seeing It Through (1920) - Janice Wilson
 The Young Rajah (1922) - Dancing Girl (uncredited)
 Madness of Youth (1923) - The Dancer
 The Brass Bottle (1923)
 Tea: With a Kick! (1923) - Gwen Van Peebles
 The Thief of Bagdad (1924) - The Princess
 Garragan (1924)
 The City of Temptation (1925) - Wanda Menkoff
 Big Pal (1925) - Helen Truscott
 The Big Parade (1925) - Justine Devereux (uncredited)
 The Prude's Fall (1925) - Sonia Roubetsky
 Captain Fearless (1925)
 Pleasures of the Rich (1926) - Phyliss Worthing
 Aloma of the South Seas (1926) - Sylvia
 Dame Chance (1926) - Gail Vernon
 Twinkletoes (1926) - Lilac
 Venus of Venice (1927) - Jean
 Die selige Exzellenz (1927) - Vanda Mekoff
 Good Time Charley (1927) - Elaine Keene
 Her Wild Oat (1927) - Miss Whitley
 The Whip Woman (1928) - Mme. Haldane
 Name the Woman (1928) - Nina Palmer
 The Olympic Hero (1928) - Mary Brown
 Oh, Kay! (1928) - Constance Appleton
 Synthetic Sin (1929) - Member of Frank's Gang #5
 The Younger Generation (1929) - Irma Striker (uncredited)
 Prisoners (1929) - Lenke
 Smiling Irish Eyes (1929) - Goldie Devore
 The Show of Shows (1929) - Performer in 'Ladies of the Ensemble' Number
 General Crack (1929) - Court Lady
 Strictly Modern (1930) - Aimee Spencer
 Golden Dawn (1930) - Sister Hedwig
 Madam Satan (1930) - Miss Conning Tower
 Stepping Sisters (1932) - Minor Role (uncredited)
 Midnight Club (1933, uncredited)
 Morning Glory (1933, uncredited)
 Bolero (1934, uncredited)
 The Scarlet Empress (1934) - Catherine's Lady-in-Waiting (uncredited)
 Cleopatra (1934, uncredited)

References

External links

 

1900 births
1988 deaths
Actresses from Indianapolis
American film actresses
American silent film actresses
20th-century American actresses
Burials at Woodlawn Cemetery (Detroit)
WAMPAS Baby Stars